Maurice Colbourne (24 September 1939 – 4 August 1989) was an English stage and television actor who starred as Tom Howard in the BBC television series Howards' Way. He is also known for roles in other television series such as Gangsters, The Onedin Line, The Day of the Triffids and Doctor Who. He was usually cast as a villain in his career.

Early life 

Maurice Colbourne was born Roger Middleton in Sheffield, three weeks after Britain and France declared war on Germany upon the outbreak of the Second World War, and studied acting at the Central School of Speech and Drama in London. He took his stage name from that of an earlier film actor called Maurice Colbourne, (24 September 1894 – 22 September 1965), who shared the same birthday (in a different year) as his.

Career 

In 1972, he co-founded, together with Michael Irving and Guy Sprung, the Half Moon Theatre near Aldgate, east London. This was a successful, radical theatre company, performing initially in an 80-seat disused synagogue in Half Moon Passage, E1. In 1985, the company moved to a converted chapel in Mile End Road, near Stepney Green. He performed in many productions at Half Moon Theatre, including In the Jungle of the Cities, Will Wat, If Not, What Will?, Heroes of the Iceberg Hotel, Sawdust Caesar, Dan Dare and Chaste Maid in Cheapside. He also directed several productions, including Silver Tassie, Alkestis, The Shoemakers and Pig Bank. He returned in 1979 to perform in Guys and Dolls.

He first became well known when he played the lead in a BBC drama series, Gangsters, from 1975–78, and afterwards appeared regularly on television. This included a guest appearance in a 1977 episode of Van der Valk, "Everybody Does It". He played Charles Marston, the love interest of Lady Fogarty, in the seventh series of The Onedin Line screened from 22 July to 23 September 1979. He played a mercenary in an episode of the Return of the Saint called "Duel in Venice". He played the character Jack Coker in the BBC's television miniseries adaptation of John Wyndham's The Day of the Triffids (1981). He also twice appeared in Doctor Who as the character Lytton (in Resurrection of the Daleks (1984) and Attack of the Cybermen (1985)).

Colbourne played lead character Tom Howard in 61 episodes of the successful BBC television drama Howards' Way from 1985 to 1989. During a break in filming of the fifth series, he died suddenly aged 49 from a heart attack while renovating a holiday home in Dinan, Brittany, France. The programme continued to the end of series five and for a sixth series, to tie up the storylines, with Colbourne's character being written out of the scripts.

Filmography

References

External links 
 
 Maurice Colbourne on Stages of Half Moon

1939 births
1989 deaths
20th-century English male actors
Alumni of the Royal Central School of Speech and Drama
English male film actors
English male stage actors
English male television actors
Male actors from Sheffield